15760 Albion, provisional designation , was the first trans-Neptunian object to be discovered after Pluto and Charon. Measuring about 108–167 kilometres in diameter, it was discovered in 1992 by David C. Jewitt and Jane X. Luu at the Mauna Kea Observatory, Hawaii. After the discovery, they dubbed the object "Smiley" and it was shortly hailed as the tenth planet by the press. It is a "cold" classical Kuiper belt object and gave rise to the name cubewano for this kind of object, after the  portion of its designation. Decoding its provisional designation, "QB1" reveals that it was the 27th object found in the second half of August of that year. As of January 2018, around 2,400 further objects have been found beyond Neptune, a majority of which are classical Kuiper belt objects. It was named after Albion from William Blake's mythology.

Naming 

This minor planet was named after Albion from the complex mythology of English poet and painter William Blake (1757–1827). Albion is the island-dwelling primeval man whose division resulted into The Four Zoas: Urizen, Tharmas, Luvah/Orc and Urthona/Los. The name Albion itself derives from the ancient and mythological name of Britain. The official naming citation was published by the Minor Planet Center on 31 January 2018.

It has received the number 15760 and remained unnamed until January 2018 (it was normally referred to simply as "QB1", even though this was technically ambiguous without the year of discovery).

Legacy
The next year in 1993, objects in similar orbits were found including (15788) 1993 SB, (15789) 1993 SC, (181708) 1993 FW, and (385185) 1993 RO.

Over one thousand bodies were found in the Kuiper belt orbiting between about 30 and 50 AU from the Sun in the twenty years after finding 15760 Albion.  This revealed a vast belt of bodies, more than just Pluto and Albion themselves.  By 2018, over 2000 Kuiper belt objects were discovered.

See also
(181708) 1993 FW
List of trans-Neptunian objects
Kuiper belt

Notes
Minor planet and asteroid provisional designations follow a format, in which the year it was discovered comes first, followed by the half-month it was discovered alphabetically (e.g. A=January 1–15, B=January 16–31 and so on, but skipping the letters I and Z) and then the order of its discovery alphabetically followed by a number (e.g. 1992 QA, 1992 QB, 1992 QC ... 1992 QY, 1992 QZ, 1992 QA1, 1992 QB1 and so on.) According to this, Q=August 16–31 and B1=25+2=27.

References

External links 
 Beyond Jupiter: 15760 Albion, Nikolai Wünsche, Journal for Occultation Astronomy, October 2019
 The Discovery of the Kuiper Belt, David Jewitt, Astronomy Beat, 3 May 2010
 New Planet Found in the Outer Solar System, European Southern Observatory, 2 October 1992
 1992 QB1 - First Object Discovered in Kuiper Belt, David Jewitt, 14 September 1992
 
 

015760
Discoveries by David C. Jewitt
Discoveries by Jane Luu
Named minor planets
19920830